USS Welcome (SP-1175) was a United States Navy patrol vessel in commission from 1917 to 1918 or 1919.

Welcome was built as a private open-cockpit motorboat of the same name at Saint Paul, Minnesota, in 1914. She was used as a commercial sightseeing boat on the Saint Louis River.

On 7 August 1917, the U.S. Navy acquired her under a free lease from her owner, R. H. Wilcox of Detroit, Michigan, for use as a section patrol boat during World War I. She was commissioned as USS Welcome (SP-1175) on 17 August 1917.

Welcome operated on patrol duties on the Great Lakes until the annual icing over of the lakes ended the 1917 shipping season, when the patrol boat  towed her to the American Boat Company dock at Detroit, Michigan, in late November 1917 for seasonal lay-up. She returned to service after the spring thaw in 1918, and patrolled until the end of the 1918 shipping season in November 1918.

Welcome was returned to Wilcox on 7 March 1919 and stricken from the Navy Directory the same day.

References

Department of the Navy Naval History and Heritage Command Online Library of Selected Images: U.S. Navy Ships: USS Welcome (SP-1175), 1917–1919. Originally the civilian motor boat Welcome (1914)
NavSource Online: Section Patrol Craft Photo Archive Welcome (SP 1175)

Patrol vessels of the United States Navy
World War I patrol vessels of the United States
Ships built in Minnesota
1914 ships
Great Lakes ships